The Heraldo de Madrid (originally El Heraldo de Madrid) was a Spanish daily newspaper published from 1890 to 1939, with an evening circulation. It came to espouse a Republican leaning in its later spell.

History 
Since then, it would grow to become a major publication, as well as the mouthpiece of the Democratic Liberal political platform of José Canalejas.

Owned by the Busquets brothers ( and Juan, holders of the  since 1918), Manuel Fontdevila was hired in 1927 as editor. The Heraldo de Madrid would embrace a Republican profile from then on. A very popular newspaper among the Madrilenians, it endured difficulties during the dictatorship of Primo de Rivera. However, the members of its editorial board were elected to the Parliament in 1931.

Already started the Spanish Civil War, rebel general Juan Yagüe had already announced a grim fate for the daily in September 1936 after the rebels seized Talavera de la Reina: "Cuando entremos en Madrid lo primero que voy a hacer es cortarle la cabeza al director del Heraldo de Madrid" ("When we enter Madrid the first thing I'm going to do is cut off the head of the director of the Heraldo de Madrid").

However the Francoists did not enter the city in 1936, and the daily, whose direction was assumed by Federico Morena by 1937, endured more than two years with a reduced staff. The last issue of the newspaper was published on 27 March 1939.

Editors 
  (1890–1893)
 , "Kasabal" (1893–1902)
 José Francos Rodríguez (1902–1906)
 Baldomero Argente (1906–1909)
  (1909–1926)
  (1927–1936)
  (1936–1937)
 Federico de la Morena (1937–1939)

Collaborators 
The staff of the newspaper included standout writers and correspondents such as José Echegaray, Ramiro de Maeztu, Carmen de Burgos ("Colombine"), Ramón del Valle-Inclán, Isabel Oyarzábal or Manuel Chaves Nogales, to name a few.

References 
Citations

Bibliography

External links

Daily newspapers published in Spain
Newspapers published in Madrid
Spanish-language newspapers
Newspapers established in 1890
1890 establishments in Spain
1939 disestablishments in Spain
Publications disestablished in 1939
Republicanism in Spain
Defunct newspapers published in Spain